A piano trio is a group of piano and two other instruments, usually a violin and a cello, or a piece of music written for such a group. It is one of the most common forms found in classical chamber music. The term can also refer to a group of musicians who regularly play this repertoire together; for a number of well-known piano trios, see below.

The term "piano trio" is also used for jazz trios, where it most commonly designates a pianist accompanied by bass and drums, though guitar or saxophone may figure as well.

Form

Works titled "Piano Trio" tend to be in the same overall shape as a sonata. Initially this was in the three movement form, though some of Haydn's have two movements. Mozart, in five late works, is generally credited with transforming the accompanied keyboard sonata, in which the essentially optional cello doubles the bass of the keyboard left hand, into the balanced trio which has since been a central form of chamber music. With the early 19th century, particularly Beethoven, this genre was felt to be more appropriate to cast in the four movement form. Piano trios that are set in the Sonata tradition share the general concerns of such works for their era, and often are reflective directly of symphonic practice with individual movements laid out according to the composer's understanding of the sonata form.

In the Classical era, home music-making made the piano trio a very popular genre for arrangements of other works. For example, Beethoven transcribed his first two symphonies for piano trio. Thus a large number of works exist for the arrangement of piano, violin and violoncello which are not generally titled or numbered as piano trios, but which are nonetheless part of the overall genre. These include single movements as well as sets of variations such as Beethoven's Variations on 'Ich bin der Schneider Kakadu' Op. 121a and Variations in E flat major Op. 44.

After the Classical era, works for piano and two instruments continue to be written which are not presented as in the sonata tradition, or are arrangements of other works. Many of these individual works are popular on concert programs, for example Suk's Elegie.

For individual articles treating works for piano trio, see :Category:Compositions for piano trio.

The role of the three instruments

The piano trios of the Classical era, notably those of Haydn, are dominated by the piano part.  The violin plays the melody only a certain amount of the time, and when it does, is often doubled by the piano.  The cello part is very much subordinated, usually just doubling the bass line in the piano.  It is thought that this practice was quite intentional on Haydn's part and was related to the sonority of the instruments of Haydn's day:  the piano was fairly weak and "tinkling" in tone, and benefited from the tonal strengthening of other instruments. Mozart's five late (K. 496 and later) trios are generally felt to mark the assured arrival of the form, attentive to balanced voices and three-part dialogue.

Beethoven's trios continued the compositional objectives inaugurated by Mozart. The new idea of equality was never implemented completely; the extent to which it is realized varies from one composition to the next, as well as among movements within a single composition. Certainly, by the mid-nineteenth century, all three instruments had been modified to have a very powerful sound, and each can hold its own in a modern ensemble.

The earlier trios are now frequently performed and recorded using authentic instruments, of the kind for which they were originally written.  Such performances restore the sonic balance the composer would have expected, and have proven popular.

Other combinations
Some rather rare combinations of instruments have nonetheless inspired a few outstanding works.

Haydn wrote three trios for flute, cello and piano (H. 15/15-17), a combination for which Carl Maria von Weber also wrote one work (op. 63).
Beethoven wrote his Trio in G major, WoO 37 (1786) for flute, bassoon and piano.
Mikhail Glinka wrote his Trio pathétique in D minor for clarinet, bassoon and piano, although is also performed with a violin or cello substituting the clarinet or the bassoon, respectively.
Francis Poulenc's Trio for oboe, bassoon and piano op. 43 (1926).
The Horn-violin-piano trio is exemplified by Brahms' Trio Op. 40 in E flat and György Ligeti's 1982 Trio for Violin, Horn and Piano.
Trios with clarinet include masterpieces such as Mozart's Kegelstatt Trio and works by Beethoven, Brahms and Bartók; many more works are listed in Clarinet-violin-piano trio, Clarinet-viola-piano trio and Clarinet-cello-piano trio.
Ignaz Lachner wrote all of his six piano trios for violin, viola and piano.
The jazz trio formation of saxophone, piano and percussion has been taken up as an alternative "piano trio" in the field of contemporary classical music, initially by Trio Accanto who since 1994 have commissioned more than 100 works for this combination. Several other trios have been formed to perform this repertoire.

Example piano trios, extant and defunct

Among the best known of such groups are or have been:

Altenberg Trio (Austria)
Amatis Trio (the Netherlands)
 (Berlin, Germany)
Maria Baptist Trio (Berlin, Germany)
Istomin-Stern-Rose Trio, consisting of Eugene Istomin, Isaac Stern and Leonard Rose. (United States)
One consisting of Alfred Cortot, Jacques Thibaud and Pablo Casals, earlier in the 20th century
The Spivakovsky Trio, consisting of Jascha Spivakovsky, Tossy Spivakovsky and Edmnd Kurtz, earlier in the 20th century
 The Kalichstein-Laredo-Robinson Trio (United States)
The Beaux Arts Trio (United States), whose commitment to using the same players in every concert pioneered a new generation of similarly committed groups; defunct
The Sitkovetsky Trio (United Kingdom) consisting of Alexander Sitkovetsky, Wu Qian and Isang Enders
Trio di Trieste (Italy) consisting of Dario De Rosa, Renato Zanettovich, and Libero Lana/Amedeo Baldovino;  defunct
The "Ax-Kim-Ma" trio, consisting of Emanuel Ax, Young-Uck Kim, and Yo-Yo Ma (United States)
Eroica Trio (United States)
Ahn Trio (United States/Korea)
The Borodin Trio (United States)
Trio Fontenay (Germany)
Trio Céleste (United States), consisting of Kevin Kwan Loucks, Iryna Krechkovsky, and Ross Gasworth
Suk Trio (Czech Republic)
The Florestan Trio (United Kingdom)
The Greenwich Trio (United Kingdom)
The Gryphon Trio (Canada)
The Oberlin Trio  (United States)
The Alma Trio  (United States)
Trio Vega (Spain)
The Kandinsky Trio (United States)
Trio Wanderer (France)
Haydn Trio Eisenstadt (Austria): Harald Kosik, Hannes Gradwohl, Bernd Gradwohl/Verena Stourzh.
Bamberg Trio (Germany)
Petrof Piano Trio (Czech Republic)
Manhattan Piano Trio (United States)
Spirale Piano Trio (Belgium)
Xonor Trio (United States)
Vanic Trio (United States)
Vienna Piano Trio (Austria) 
Stuttgart Piano Trio (German)
The Dutch Trio (Germany/The Netherlands)

Famous works for piano trio

Anton Arensky's Piano Trio No. 1 in D minor
Ludwig van Beethoven's trios, especially Piano Trio No. 7 in B-flat major "Archduke", Op. 97
Johannes Brahms's Piano Trios No. 1 in B major, Op. 8, No. 2 in C major, Op. 87 and No. 3 in C minor, Op. 101
Frédéric Chopin's Piano Trio in G minor, Op. 8
Antonín Dvořák's Piano Trio No. 4 in E minor ("Dumky"), Op. 90
Gabriel Fauré's piano trio, Op. 120
Joseph Haydn's 45 piano trios, particularly those composed from the mid-1780s onwards
Franz Liszt's Hungarian Rhapsodies No. 9 and No. 12
Felix Mendelssohn's two piano trios
Wolfgang Amadeus Mozart's piano trios, particularly No. 3, 4 and 5
Sergei Rachmaninoff's Elegiac Trios No. 1 in G minor and No. 2 in D minor
Maurice Ravel's Trio for Piano, Violin and Cello
Franz Schubert's Piano Trio No. 1 and No. 2
Clara Schumann's Piano Trio
Robert Schumann's Piano Trio No. 1 in D minor and Piano Trio No. 3 in G minor
Dmitri Shostakovich's Piano Trio No. 2 in E minor
Bedřich Smetana's Trio for Piano, Violin and Cello
Pyotr Ilyich Tchaikovsky's Piano Trio in A minor, Op. 50

See also 

 Piano six hands
 Violin
 Violoncello
 Piano trio repertoire
 Triple concerto for violin, cello, and piano
 Clarinet-violin-piano trio
 Clarinet-viola-piano trio
 Clarinet-cello-piano trio
Oboe-bassoon-piano trio
 Piano quartet
 Piano quintet
 Piano sextet

References

Piano
 
Chamber music
Types of musical groups
Violins
Piano